This is a table of all gold medalists in the Badminton World Championships. Since 1983, the event has been held every two years, with it changing to an annual event since 2005 but taking a break during Olympic years.

Results

World Championships of the WBF

References

BWF World Championships